This is a partial list of breweries in England. Beer in England pre-dates other alcoholic drinks produced in England, and has been brewed continuously since prehistoric times. As a beer brewing country, England is known for its top fermented cask beer (also called real ale) which finishes maturing in the cellar of the pub rather than at the brewery and is served with only natural carbonation. Modern developments include consolidation of large brewers into multinational corporations; growth of beer consumerism; expansion of microbreweries and increased interest in bottle conditioned beers.

In 2000, there were around 500 breweries in the UK, while the 2015 edition of the Good Beer Guide listed 1,285 breweries operating in Britain. A 2015 government analysis found that a new brewery was opening in Britain every other day, with Britain becoming a 'brewing powerhouse'.

By 2020, the number of breweries had increased rapidly, and the Good Beer Guide lists 1,850 breweries.

Breweries in England

Gallery

See also

 Ale conner 
 Beer and breweries by region
 Beer in England
 Beer in Wales
 Brewers of Burton
 List of breweries in Berkshire
 List of breweries in Birmingham
 List of breweries in the Black Country
 List of breweries in Scotland
 List of microbreweries

References

English cuisine-related lists
England
 
Breweries in Nottinghamshire
Breweries in Yorkshire